Glenbrook railway station was on the Cork, Blackrock and Passage Railway in County Cork, Ireland.

History

The station opened on 1 August 1902.

Passenger services were withdrawn on 12 September 1932.

Routes

Further reading

References

Disused railway stations in County Cork
Railway stations opened in 1902
Railway stations closed in 1932
1902 establishments in Ireland
1932 disestablishments in Ireland
Railway stations in the Republic of Ireland opened in the 20th century